Nathan Yonathan (20 September 1923 – 12 March 2004) was an Israeli poet.

His poems have been translated from Hebrew and published in more than a dozen languages, among them: Arabic, Bulgarian, Chinese, Dutch, English, French, German, Portuguese, Russian, Spanish, Vietnamese, and Yiddish.

Biography
Natan Yonatan was born Nathan Klein, in Kiev in the Ukraine in 1923. In 1925, his family immigrated to Mandate Palestine. They were among the early settlers (1935), of Kfar Ma'as, an agricultural village near Petah Tikva.

Yonatan was active in the Hashomer Hatzair youth movement and in 1945 joined kibbutz Sarid in the Jezreel Valley. He was a member of Sarid for 46 years.  From 1991 until his death, he resided in the suburbs of Tel Aviv.

He fathered two sons with his first wife Tzefira: Lior—who fell in action in the Yom Kippur War at age 21—and Ziv, musician, composer and radio producer. Natan Yonatan was also father to his second wife Nili's daughter and grandson: Netta and Tom. While love and passion, as well as the Israeli landscape, permeate his work, the authenticity of Yonatan's poems mourning the loss of Lior – the terrible price of war – became this poet's hallmark.

He held degrees in Hebrew Literature and Comparative Literature from the Hebrew University of Jerusalem, Tel Aviv University and Oxford University.  He lectured internationally, as well as within the Israeli public school system. One of Israel’s most eminent teachers of creative writing, he was known for his generous spirit and desire to foster new poetic talent.

While serving as long-term Editor-in-Chief of the Sifriat Poalim publishing house, he was also the unanimously elected President of the Hebrew Writers Union and represented Israel at literary conferences around the globe.

Awards
 1946 – the Bialik Prize for literature
 1960 – the Lamdan Prize for children's literature
 1975 – the Prime Minister's Prize for Hebrew Literary Works
 1979 – the  awarded by the Municipality of Holon

Works

Yonatan published his first poem, “When Ships Put Out to Sea”, during the Second World War, in 1940 at age 16 before the establishment of the State of Israel, and soon became one of modern Israel's most read and beloved poets.  Notwithstanding the subtle complexity of his use of Hebrew's many registers and intertexts, Yonatan’s lyricism lends itself to musical composition.  Dozens of his poems have become traditional favorites, set to music by Israel's foremost songwriters and composers.  Yonatan’s poems are sung and broadcast for national occasions, both festive and mournful.

Writings; books
 Dusty Paths (poems), Sifriat Poalim, 1951
 To the Fallow Land (poems for children), Sifriat Poalim, 1954
 Once We Loved (poems), Sifriat Poalim, 1957
 Between Spring and a Cloud (stories for teens), Sifriat Poalim, 1959
 Once-Loved Dusty Paths (selected poems), Sifriat Poalim, 1960
 Poems Along the Shore (poems), Sifriat Poalim, 1962
 Lilac (stories for children), Sifriat Poalim, 1963
 Poems of Dust and Wind (poems for teens), Sifriat Poalim, 1965
 Till the End of Indian Summer (American travelogue), Sifriat Poalim, 1968
 Poems at Sea-Dusk (poems), Sifriat Poalim, 1970
 More Stories Between Spring and a Cloud (stories for teens), Sifriat Poalim, 1971
 Poems (Dedicated to Lior) (poems), Sifriat Poalim, 1974
 Stones in the Darkness (selected poems translated into English, trans. Richard Flantz and others), Sifriat Poalim, 1975
 Poems This Far (poems), Sifriat Poalim, 1979 Salt and Light (selected poems translated into Russian), Sifriat Poalim, 1980
 Pocket Collection (selections from 40 years of poetry), Hakibbutz Hameuchad, 1982
 Shores (100 poems set to music, including both words and musical notation), Keter, 1983
 Other Poems (poems), Sifriat Poalim, 1984
 Itzik Manger—Selected Poems (translations from Yiddish to Hebrew), Keter, 1987
 Poems on the Mountain Ranges (poems), Zmora-Bitan, 1988
 Poems with Love (collected love poems), Sifriat Poalim, 1990
 Poems on Earth and Water (collected poems about the land), Sifriat Poalim, 1993
 Veiled Faced is Time (poems), Sifriat Poalim, 1995
 Salt and Light (selected poems translated into Bulgarian), Sifriat Poalim, 1995
 Poetry’s Grace (collected poems on the art of poetry), Sifriat Poalim, 1996
 Gleanings and Forgotten Sheaves (selected poems), Sifriat Poalim, 1997
 Poems on “Sefer Hayashar” (poems inspired by the Bible and other traditional Jewish sources, with landscape photography), Or-Am, 1998
 Poems Cloaked in Evening (poetry anthology selected and edited by Natan Yonatan, published two days after his death), Yediot Ahronot, 2004.
 Within the Song to Live (Hebrew-English anthology, trans. Janice Silverman Rebibo and others, music CD, composer: Gidi Koren, performed by The Brothers and the Sisters), Gefen Jerusalem & NY, 2005.

Further reading
The Modern Hebrew Poem Itself (2003),

References

External links
Website dedicated to Natan Yonatan 
Yonatan at the Institute for the Translation of Hebrew Literature 
The Jewish Agency for Israel mourns Yonatan’s passing 
In Memory of Natan Yonatan
Review of Yonatan's Poems Cloaked in Evening
Within the Song to Live by Natan Yonatan, audio clips and reviews
First Anniversary of Natan Yonatan's passing
 Natan Yonatan on The Next Fifty Years

See also
List of Bialik Prize recipients

1923 births
2004 deaths
Hebrew-language poets
Israeli male poets
Ukrainian Jews
Soviet Jews
Soviet emigrants to Mandatory Palestine
20th-century Israeli poets
20th-century male writers
Recipients of Prime Minister's Prize for Hebrew Literary Works
Burials at Kiryat Shaul Cemetery